Evel, Ével, or EVEL may refer to:

People
Evel Knievel (1938-2007), American stunt performer
Evel Dick (Richard Louis Donato, born 1963), American winner of the reality game show Big Brother 8

Other uses
Ével, a river in France
EVEL, or English votes for English laws, a parliamentary procedure used to address aspects of the West Lothian question in the UK parliament

See also
 Bejtyl Evel Mosque, a mosque in Tirana, Albania
Evel Knievel (disambiguation)
 Evel Rabbati, a tractate in the Babylonian Talmud
Evil (disambiguation)